The 1925 South Dakota State Jackrabbits football team was an American football team that represented South Dakota State University in the North Central Conference during the 1925 college football season. In its seventh season under head coach Charles A. West, the team compiled a 2–3–2 record and was outscored by a total of 45 to 20. Frank Kelley was the team captain.

South Dakota State center Starbuck was selected as a first-team player on the 1925 All-North Central Conference football team.

Schedule

References

South Dakota State
South Dakota State Jackrabbits football seasons
South Dakota State football